Cold Skin (orig. Catalan La pell freda) is the debut novel by Catalan author Albert Sánchez Piñol. The novel has had numerous reprints and has been translated into 37 languages. More than 150,000 copies of its original edition were sold.

Synopsis
The novel chronicles the story of a former fighter for the independence of Ireland who, unmotivated by the events of the Western World, decides to escape from the society in which he lives. He accepts a job offer as a weather official on a remote island in the south Atlantic close to the Antarctic Circle.

On this island there is only one inhabitant, the signals official Batis Caffo, who does not help the Irishman, and hides all the information which he has on the island. So the hero has to spend a night alone, where he suffers the attack of strange monsters that are similar to frogs.

Through his cunning he manages to stay in the lighthouse with Caffo, and thus he can withstand attacks from the big frogs. After some days, he finds out that Caffo has sex with a domesticated monster, the female Aneris. Although the Irishman first thinks that the monsters are evil and murderous, after meeting Aneris, he changes his mind.

Prizes
It won the Ojo Crítico Narrativa prize in 2002, and has been translated into 37 languages.

Film adaption

Alex and David Pastor wrote the film adaption, directed by Xavier Gens and co-starring David Oakes, Ray Stevenson and Aura Garrido. The premiere was scheduled for the Étrange Festival 2017, in Paris, France.

References

External links
Fiendishly clever review in The Observer
The remedy for 'Cold Skin' has unpleasant side effects feature in The San Diego Union-Tribune

2002 novels
Catalan-language novels
21st-century Spanish novels
Horror novels
Novels set in Antarctica
Canongate Books books